Vladan Milovanović (born 7 July 1970) is a Serbian former professional footballer who played as a striker. He spent the majority of his footballing career in Germany.

Career
Milovanović came through the youth categories of Red Star Belgrade, before playing for Napredak Kruševac in the Yugoslav Second League. He subsequently moved abroad to German side Dynamo Dresden in 1992. Over the following decade, Milovanović played for numerous lower league clubs, having his most prolific performances with Hannover 96 in the Regionalliga Nord. He also briefly played for Austria Lustenau in the Austrian Second League.

References

External links
 
 

2. Bundesliga players
Association football forwards
2. Liga (Austria) players
Bundesliga players
Dynamo Dresden players
Eintracht Braunschweig players
Expatriate footballers in Austria
Expatriate footballers in Germany
FK Napredak Kruševac players
FSV Frankfurt players
Hannover 96 players
Regionalliga players
SC Austria Lustenau players
Serbia and Montenegro expatriate footballers
Serbia and Montenegro expatriate sportspeople in Austria
Serbia and Montenegro expatriate sportspeople in Germany
Serbia and Montenegro footballers
Serbian footballers
SV Arminia Hannover players
SV Babelsberg 03 players
TuS Celle FC players
VfL Osnabrück players
Yugoslav footballers
1970 births
Living people